FNZ may refer to: 
 FNZ (company), financial services company
 Fibronectin
 FnZ, Australian record production and songwriting duo also known as Finatik N Zac
 Future New Zealand, a defunct political party of New Zealand